Currumbin is an electoral district of the Legislative Assembly in the Australian state of Queensland.

The district lies in the south-east corner of the state, along the New South Wales border. The district takes in southern parts of the Gold Coast and much of its hinterland. It includes the suburbs of Currumbin, Coolangatta, Elanora and Tugun as well as the rural Currumbin Valley and Tallebudgera Valley. The electorate was first contested in 1986.

Members for Currumbin

Election results

References

External links
 Electorate profile (Antony Green, ABC)

Currumbin